Björn the Eunuch (Icelandic: Björn er Geldingur, Swedish: Björn Hovmannen) was a semi-legendary king of Sweden who would have lived some time in the 10th century. Björn the Eunuch is said to have been a ruler of the House of Munsö who reigned briefly before being emasculated by his enemies and exiled to the Duchy of Normandy.

See also
Early Swedish History
House of Munsö

Notes

Bibliography
Lagerquist, Lars O. (1997). Sveriges Regenter, från forntid till nutid. Norstedts, Stockholm. 

Semi-legendary kings of Sweden
10th-century births
10th-century deaths
Eunuchs
House of Munsö
10th-century Swedish people